Below is a list of events in chess in 1996, as well as the top ten FIDE rated chess players of that year.

Top players

FIDE top 10 by Elo rating – January 1996

Vladimir Kramnik  2775
Garry Kasparov  2775
Anatoly Karpov  2770
Vassily Ivanchuk  2735
Gata Kamsky  2735
Viswanathan Anand  2725
Veselin Topalov  2700
Boris Gelfand  2700
Alexei Shirov  2690
Judit Polgár  2675

Chess news in brief

Anatoly Karpov defeats Gata Kamsky 10½-7½ in Elista, Kalmykia, to successfully defend his FIDE World Chess Championship Title. FIDE's suggestion of playing the match in Baghdad is dropped after protests are lodged.
Zsuzsa Polgar defeats Xie Jun 8½-4½ in Spain, to win the Women's World Chess Championship.
Garry Kasparov wins the double round, six-player tournament at Las Palmas. The tournament is one of the strongest of all time, with an average Elo rating of 2757.
Kasparov defeats Deep Blue 4–2, despite losing the first game. As the (Philadelphia) contest progresses, he appears to get the measure of the IBM computer. The world media covers the match with an intense level of scrutiny.
Veselin Topalov has a very successful year, including an  outright win at the 3rd Lord Novgorod tournament with 6/10.
Vladimir Kramnik and Topalov tie for first at Dos Hermanas with 6/9, ahead of Kasparov and Viswanathan Anand.
The annual Wijk aan Zee Corus Tournament is won by Vassily Ivanchuk with 9/13, ahead of Anand (8) and Topalov (7½).
Topalov and Kasparov win at Amsterdam (both 6½/9).
Gelfand, Topalov and Karpov share success at Vienna (all 5½/9).
The Moscow Grand Prix event is won by Kramnik and the Geneva Grand Prix event by Anand.
Alexander Khalifman wins the Russian Chess Championship, held in Elista.
The Yerevan Olympiad is won by Russia (38½/56), ahead of Ukraine on 35 and USA and England (both 34). Outstanding scorers include the gold medal-winning Mohammed Al-Modiahki of Qatar (8/10), Karen Asrian of Armenia (10/12) and Matthew Sadler of England (10½/13). Kasparov (7/9), Ivanchuk (8½/11) and Peter Svidler (8½/11) are among the top names that shine. The U.S. team is without Kamsky, but Alex Yermolinsky takes a silver medal for his board 2 (8/11) performance. There are 114 teams and some 665 players in attendance.
The U.S. Chess Championship, held at Parsippany, New Jersey is won by Yermolinsky. Anjelina Belakovskaia wins the U.S. Women's Chess Championship.
Yermolinsky and Alexander Goldin tie for first place at the Philadelphia World Open.
GM Chris Ward wins the British Chess Championship, held in Nottingham. Harriet Hunt takes a second successive British Ladies title.
Gabriel Schwartzman wins the U.S. Open Chess Championship, aged 19.
Young Frenchman Étienne Bacrot proves he is already a formidable opponent, when he defeats former World Champion Vasily Smyslov by a match score of 5–1.
Israeli Emil Sutovsky wins in Medellín to become the new World Junior Chess Champion.
Ukrainian prodigy Ruslan Ponomariov wins the European Youth Chess Championship (Under 18 category), aged 12, held in Rimavská Sobota.
Swedish GM Ulf Andersson gives a 310 board simultaneous display in Alvsjo, Sweden and wins 268, draws 40 and loses 2, in 15 hours and 23 minutes.
Ex-world snooker champion Steve Davis is pronounced the new President of  the British Chess Federation.

Births

March 25 – Richárd Rapport, youngest Hungarian GM (2010) and fifth youngest GM in history at age 13 years, 11 months, and 6 days
April 18 – Daniil Dubov, Russian GM (2011)
September 27 – Illia Nyzhnyk, Ukrainian GM (2011) who won the 2007 European Youth Chess Championship (Under 12 category) and narrowly missed out on the Under 12 World Youth title the same year, on tiebreak

Deaths

Vladimir Liberzon, Russian born Israeli Grandmaster – August 4
Julio Bolbochán, Argentine Grandmaster and twice the national champion – June 28
Yosef Porat, German born IM, many times the national champion of Israel and Palestine – ?
Predrag Ostojic, Yugoslav (Serbian) Grandmaster, twice the national champion – July 5
Victor Buerger, Latvian-British player, moderately successful in tournaments of the 1920s and 30s – ?

References

Chess History & Chronology - Bill Wall (Archived 2009-10-20)
Olimpbase - Olympiads and other Team event information
FIDE rating list data 1970-97

 
20th century in chess
Chess by year